Acajete Municipality is a municipality located in the central zone in the state of Veracruz, about 20 km from state capital Xalapa. It has a surface of 90.48 km2. In the middle of 1586 this village was formed, on one of the adjoining old men of Tlacolulan's dominion. The decree N ° 64 of November 3, 1893, extinguished the municipality of La Hoya, annexing its territory to San Salvador Acajete. On November 5, 1932, the municipal head-board San Salvador Acajete changes the name to Acajete.

Geographic limits
Acajete Municipality is delimited to the north by Tlacolulan and Las Vigas de Ramírez to the east by Rafael Lucio, to the south by Tlalnelhuayocan and to the west by Perote. It is watered by affluent creeks of the Río Sedeño, which are tributaries of the Actopan. The principal creek is the Pixquiac.

Agriculture

It produces principally maize, potatoes, apples, pear and plum.

Celebrations

In  Acajete , in August takes place the celebration in honor to San Salvador, Patron of the town, and in December takes place the celebration in honor to Virgen de Guadalupe.

Climate
Despite being in the tropics, due to its high altitude (2023 m or 6637 ft.), Acajete features a humid subtropical highland climate (Köppen climate classification: Cfb).

References

External links 
  Municipal Official Site
  Municipal Official Information

Municipalities of Veracruz